Coyote Ridge Corrections Center is a medium security prison located in Connell, Washington.  Coyote Ridge is the largest prison by capacity in the state and is operated by the Washington State Department of Corrections.

Inmates of Coyote Ridge typically have more than six years up to life to serve.  Attached to the main facility is the minimum-security "camp", where inmates must have six years or less on their sentences. The camp buildings look more like those of an average community college, complete with landscaping. Inmates sleep in dormitories, operate a textile factory, and grow some of their own food in a small garden on the grounds. Some inmates are allowed to go off-site to work in highly supervised jobs (including the traditional litter clean up).

The facility was the first prison campus in the United States to achieve LEED Gold certification.

As of January 2011, the main facility is almost full with an inmate population of over 2100.

A majority of the facility's inmates, approximately 1,700 of 2,065, went on a food strike in early 2019 to protest the breakfast menu served to them.

Notable inmates
Larry Williams, Sedro-Woolley murderer, convicted in the May 2011 death of his adopted 13-year-old daughter Hana Williams.
Adam Baldridge, from Maple Valley, WA, Convicted of molesting and attempting to have sex with a 4 year old girl. 
Gregory Mccrea, from Spokane, WA, convicted of eight counts of child rape, three counts of child molestation and one count of sexual exploitation of a child.
Martin Lee Sanders, murderer, convicted of murdering two teenage girls in Spokane, WA.

See also

List of law enforcement agencies in Washington (state)
List of United States state correction agencies
List of U.S. state prisons
List of Washington state prisons

References

Buildings and structures in Franklin County, Washington
Prisons in Washington (state)
1992 establishments in Washington (state)